Aguilares is a Census-designated place in Webb County, Texas, United States. This was a new CDP for the 2010 census with a population of 21.

It is one of several colonias in the county.

Geography
Aguilares is located at  (27.451627, -99.093233).

History

Aguilares dates to 1870. It is named for the first settlers and ranchers, José, Locario, Francisco, Próspero, and Librado Aguilar. It became a stop on the Texas-Mexican Railroad in 1881 and was granted a post office nine years later. The population (thought to be a huge exaggeration) was given as 1,500 in 1910 – but four years later it was reportedly a mere 300. The Aguilar family owned a store – one of the two businesses in the community.

Oil was discovered nearby in Oilton and for a short time the town seemed to have a future – but although (or because) it was on a railroad – it lost population to the nearby county seat of Laredo. In the 1930s, the post office was discontinued and in 1939 Aquilares' population was ten. The population rose to twenty-five by 1945, but the 1990 census again reported ten residents.

Notable people
Pedro Gonzalez-Gonzalez, television and film character actor, born in Aguilares.

Education
It is in the Webb Consolidated Independent School District. The district operates Bruni High School.

The designated community college for Webb County is Laredo Community College.

References

Unincorporated communities in Texas
Unincorporated communities in Webb County, Texas
Populated places established in 1870
1870 establishments in Texas